Brian Johnston (14 April 1932 – 2 March 2013) was a British literary researcher, especially renowned for his works on the Norwegian dramatist Henrik Ibsen (1828–1906), including his three influential books, The Ibsen Cycle (1975, revised 1992),  To the Third Empire: Ibsen's Early Plays (1980), and Text and Supertext in Ibsen's Drama (1988).

Life and work
Brian Peter Johnston was the second child of Edward Thomas & Hilda Margaret Johnston having an elder brother and three younger sisters. Although he never married, he had very close contact with his extended family. He left school at 13, and had several unskilled jobs including reading gas meters and removing the pips from raspberry jam. He attended college in Birmingham from where he gained a place to read classics at Gonville and Caius College, Cambridge

In 1960, Johnston gained a First Class Honors Degree at Cambridge University, where he taught later in his life, holding a multitude of roles at Trondheim Lærerhøgskole (Norway),  Northwestern University, the University of California-Berkeley, the University of Amman (Jordan), Beirut University College (Lebanon), and several other institutions. He joined the faculty of the School of Drama, Carnegie Mellon University, Pittsburgh, in 1986, where he remained until his retirement in 2007.

Johnston edited the Norton Critical Edition of Ibsen's plays published in 2004. His translations of Ibsen include A Doll's House, Ghosts, Hedda Gabler, The Lady from the Sea, Rosmersholm, Emperor and Galilean, and Peer Gynt. They have been produced at major professional theatres across the United States.

His course in dramatic literature from ancient to modern drama is available online on the site Courses in Drama. The essays presented derive from a Survey of Drama Course Johnston taught at Carnegie Mellon University between 1987 and 2007. His discussions, as Johnston terms his essays, are divided into four sections:

 Greek (Athenian) Drama 
 European Drama (Medieval to Spanish Golden Age) 
 European Drama (Neoclassical to Romantic) 
 Modern Drama – (Ibsen to 20th Century; Modern Arab Drama)

Hegelian perspective
A key to understanding Brian Johnston's interpretation of Ibsen is his emphasis on the importance of the German philosopher G.W.F. Hegel's (1770–1831) influence on Ibsen's drama. In the Introduction to The Ibsen Cycle he describes his project as follows:

Storehouse of Western civilisation
Johnston insists that there are rich and wide-ranging references to the whole of Western civilisation in Ibsen's final twelve contemporary plays. He contends that the plays are structured with references to the 'three major spiritual traditions' of the West— 'the Hellenic, the Judeo-Christian, and the Germanic':

References

External links
 Ibsen Voyages: Brian Johnston's collected articles and lectures on Ibsen 
 Courses in Drama with Brian Johnston 
 The Ibsen Cycle 
 To the Third Empire: Ibsen's Early Plays 
 Text and Supertext in Ibsen's Drama 
 An overview of Brian Johnston's translations of Ibsen 

Henrik Ibsen researchers
Carnegie Mellon University faculty
Alumni of the University of Cambridge
English non-fiction writers
British translators
English translators
Norwegian–English translators
English male dramatists and playwrights
1932 births
2013 deaths
Male non-fiction writers